The Book Club of California is a non-profit membership organization of bibliophiles based in San Francisco, operating continuously since 1912. Its mission is to support the history and art of the book, including fine printing related to the history and literature of California and the western states of America through research, publishing, public programs, and exhibitions.  It is one of the two largest book collectors' clubs in the United States, with more than 800 members nationwide.

Early history 
The genesis of the organization was an idea for including an exhibit of rare books and fine printing in the Panama Pacific International Exposition to take place in San Francisco in 1915. Edward Robeson Taylor, John Henry Nash, W. R. K. Young and James D. Blake approached Charles Moore, the president of the exposition, with the idea in 1912, to create an organization, which gathered 58 charter members by December 1912. The original purpose of the Book Club of California was "the study of letters and the promotion of the arts pertaining to the production of books." For unknown reasons, the proposed exhibition did not take place, but the club did succeed in launching a publication program under the leadership of Albert M. Bender. Its first book publication was an ambitious one: Robert A. Cowan's Bibliography of the History of California and the American West, which appeared in 1914 as a 350-page book, printed on handmade paper by Taylor, Nash and Taylor in an edition of 250.  Among its earliest activities, in October 1917, was "A loan exhibition of incunabula held by the Book Club of California in the galleries of Hill Tolerton." It was accompanied by a descriptive catalogue printed by John Henry Nash.  The sixty-six books printed before 1501 came from the collection of Charles W. Clark of San Mateo, California.

Publications 
The club continues to publish limited edition books, using letterpress printing and emphasizing design and craftsmanship. The club is the only association in America that has continually published fine press books since 1914. The subject matter relates to the history and culture of California and sometimes other Western areas. The book authors, often club members, include historians, scholars, professional writers, and poets. In most cases, this represents the first and only appearance of their texts in printed form.

Since 1933 the club has also published a quarterly newsletter and annual keepsakes.

Library, exhibits, and programs 
The club's Albert Sperisen Library holds approximately 8,300 volumes, searchable via an online catalog, and is open to the public. The club presents three themed exhibitions per year and numerous author talks, book signings and other events. A centennial symposium, "Way Out West: Fine Printing and the Cultural History of the Book in California" was held in October 2012. Another symposium, "A Feast for the Eyes: Gastronomy and Fine Print," was held in October 2014.

The Oscar Lewis Awards 
Two Oscar Lewis Awards have been presented by the club annually since 1994 in honor of Oscar Lewis (1893-1992), San Francisco author, historian, and club secretary from 1921-1946. One award is for excellence in western history and one for the book arts. In 2016 these were presented to author James Karman and artist Richard Wagener respectively.

Prominent members 
Well-known members of the club have included Ansel Adams, Merle Armitage, Faith Baldwin, Witter Bynner, Francis P. Farquhar, Phoebe Apperson Hearst, Alfred A. Knopf, Florence Lundborg, Stanley Marcus, Franklin D. Murphy, A. Edward Newton, Lawrence Clark Powell, Aurelia Henry Reinhardt, Ward Ritchie, Norton Simon, and Kevin Starr.

Awards received 
 1996: American Printing History Association institutional award for contributions to the understanding of printing history
 2001: Commonwealth Club of California silver medal for Notable Contribution to Publishing for Splendide Californie!  Impressions of The Golden State By French Artists, 1786–1900.

References

Further reading

External links 
 
 Book Club of California at Atlas Obscura
https://babel.hathitrust.org/cgi/pt?id=uc2.ark:/13960/t6057kr0q&view=1up&seq=8&skin=2021

Clubs and societies in California
Culture of San Francisco
Non-profit organizations based in San Francisco
1912 establishments in California
San Francisco Bay Area literature